Erlandson is a Swedish patronymic surname, meaning "son of Erland", and may refer to:

 Axel Erlandson (1884–1964), Swedish American horticulturist
 Erland Erlandson (c. 1790–1875), Dano-Canadian trader and explorer
 Eric Erlandson (born 1963), American songwriter and guitarist
 Mike Erlandson (born 1964), American corporate executive
 Tom Erlandson (linebacker, born 1940), NFL linebacker for the Denver Broncos, Miami Dolphins, San Diego Chargers, and Washington State University
 Tom Erlandson (linebacker, born 1966), NFL linebacker for the Buffalo Bills and Washington Huskies

See also
Erlandsson

Swedish-language surnames
Patronymic surnames